Enontekiö Airport  is an airport located in Enontekiö, Finnish Lapland,   west southwest of Hetta, the municipal centre of Enontekiö.

Overview
It is mainly used for charter flights during the winter, particularly those of UK tour operator Transun, whose passengers account for 80% of the airport's passenger volume. Passengers on these flights are tourists coming to experience Lapland for the day or to enjoy a stay in the nearby villages of Hetta, Karesuando (Sweden) or Kautokeino (Norway). Regular flights to Enontekiö are established only in the spring and the autumn. In spring 2015 these flights were operated by Flybe Nordic. From autumn 2013 to spring 2014, the flights were operated by Air100. In 2012 and 2013, the spring flights to Helsinki-Vantaa were also provided by Flybe Nordic and before this by Finncomm Airlines. In December 2012, Enter Air operated special "Santa flights" to Enontekiö from various UK destinations on behalf of tour operator Transun and this service continued in following winters including trips with a week's stay. The nearest airport with daily flights is Kittilä Airport, 150 km road distance.

In August 2009, Finavia informed that the airport would be renamed as Enontekiö-Kautokeino Saami Airport. This was because Kautokeino in Norway (located 90 km from Enontekiö Airport) has no airport (except Kautokeino Airfield which has no scheduled service), and the nearest in Norway is 135 kilometers away. This name has been used a little in Norway, but not really by the airport.

Municipality on Enontekiö has been operating the airport since July 2021.

Airlines and destinations

There are currently no scheduled operators flying from Enontekio Airport. Ad-hoc charters during winter operate from the United Kingdom.

Statistics

See also
 List of the largest airports in the Nordic countries

References

External links
 AIP Finland – Enontekiö Airport
 
 

Airports in Finland
Airports in the Arctic
Airport
Buildings and structures in Lapland (Finland)